Arcytophyllum is a genus of flowering plants in the family Rubiaceae. The genus contains 18 species, distributed from New Mexico to Bolivia.

Description
Members of this genus are shrubs or dwarf shrubs that occupy mountainous habitats. Their leaves are oppositely arranged, small, sessile or sub-sessile, and possess inconspicuous secondary venation. Flowers are tetra- or pentamerous, with the stamens adnate to the white or pink funnelform or salverform corolla. The fruit is a capsule with septicidal dehiscence.

Species

 Arcytophyllum aristatum Standl. - Colombia, Ecuador
 Arcytophyllum cachirense (H.Karst.) K.Schum. - Colombia
 Arcytophyllum capitatum (Benth.) K.Schum. - Colombia, Ecuador
 Arcytophyllum ciliolatum Standl. - Ecuador, Perú
 Arcytophyllum ericoides (Willd. ex Roem. & Schult.) Standl. - Ecuador, Perú
 Arcytophyllum fasciculatum (A.Gray) Terrell & H.Rob. - New Mexico, Texas, Coahuila
 Arcytophyllum filiforme (Ruiz & Pav.) Standl. - Bolivia, Perú, Ecuador, Colombia 
 Arcytophyllum lavarum K.Schum. - Costa Rica, Panamá
 Arcytophyllum macbridei Standl. - Amazonas (of Perú)
 Arcytophyllum muticum (Wedd.) Standl. - Costa Rica, Panamá, Colombia, Ecuador, Venezuela
 Arcytophyllum nitidum (Kunth) Schltdl. - Colombia, Venezuela
 Arcytophyllum peruvianum (Wernham) J.H.Kirkbr. - Perú
 Arcytophyllum rivetii Danguy & Cherm. - Ecuador, Perú
 Arcytophyllum serpyllaceum (Schltdl.) Terrell - Guatemala, Chiapas, Veracruz, Oaxaca
 Arcytophyllum setosum (Ruiz & Pav.) Schltdl. - Bolivia, Perú, Ecuador, Colombia 
 Arcytophyllum thymifolium (Ruiz & Pav.) Standl. - Colombia, Ecuador, Perú
 Arcytophyllum venezuelanum Steyerm. - Venezuela
 Arcytophyllum vernicosum Standl. - Ecuador, Peru

Phylogeny and biogeography
Arcytophyllum is a monophyletic genus when A. serpyllaceum is excluded, as this species has been shown to be more closely related to Bouvardia but has not been formally transferred to another genus. The remaining species are most closely related to the North American and Caribbean genus Houstonia (including Stenaria) and one species of the polyphyletic genus Oldenlandia (Oldenlandia microtheca) distributed in Mexico and Central America, indicating that Arcytophyllum may be one of the few cases in the family Rubiaceae of a southward migration to reach the Andes. The center of diversity is in South America; namely in Ecuador, where 10 species are documented.

Floral morphology and evolution
Flowers of Arcytophyllum are distylous, meaning that two morphs exist differing in the vertical orientation of anthers and stigmas. Pin morphs have stigmas positioned above the anthers, while thrum morphs have stigmas positioned below the anthers. A study of 11 species showed significantly higher seed production in thrum than pin morphs of A. aristatum, A. lavarum, and A. vernicosum, and a similar tendency in all other sampled species. In contrast, pin morphs of A. lavarum cross pollinate more efficiently than thrum morphs, thus transmitting more of their genes to the next generation via pollen than seed. As better exporters of pollen to flowers of the opposite morph, long-styled A. lavarum give rise to disassortative pollen flow and a division in reproductive functions between the morphs. If pollinators promote the condition of distyly and asymmetric pollen flow over evolutionary time, it is plausible that gender specialization will evolve into dioecy.

References

External links 
 Encyclopedia of Life
 Global Biodiversity Information Facility
 The Plant List
 Arcytophyllum in the World Checklist of Rubiaceae

Rubiaceae genera
Spermacoceae
Flora of Central America